Chloe-Beth Morgan (born 1986) is a Welsh beauty queen who won the Miss Wales 2008 contest and competed in the Miss World 2008 competition held in South Africa, later that year.

Morgan scored the highest among the British delegates in Miss World 2008 and was chosen to represent the United Kingdom in Miss International 2009, where she placed third. She has a national diploma with a distinction in musical theatre, and qualified as a fitness instructor. she also won Miss Universe Great Britain 2011 and she represented Great Britain at the Miss Universe 2011 pageant in Brazil.

References

External links
 Miss Wales 2008

People from Cwmbran
1986 births
Living people
Miss World 2008 delegates
Miss International 2009 delegates
Miss Universe 2011 contestants
Welsh beauty pageant winners